Johannes Cornelius Bontje, known as Rob Bontje (born 12 May 1981) is a Dutch professional volleyball player, a former member of the Netherlands national team, and a participant in the Olympic Games Athens 2004.

Honours

Clubs
 FIVB Club World Championship
  Doha 2011 – with Jastrzębski Węgiel

 CEV Cup
  2010/2011 – with Sisley Treviso

 National championships
 2003/2004  Dutch Championship, with Ortec Nesselande 
 2014/2015  German Championship, with Berlin Recycling Volleys
 2015/2016  Belgian Championship, with Noliko Maaseik
 2016/2017  Belgian SuperCup, with Noliko Maaseik
 2016/2017  Belgian Championship, with Noliko Maaseik

Individual awards
 2015: CEV Champions League – Best Middle Blocker

References

External links

 
 Player profile at LegaVolley.it 
 Player profile at Volleybox.net 

1981 births
Living people
People from Born, Netherlands
Sportspeople from Limburg (Netherlands)
Dutch men's volleyball players
Olympic volleyball players of the Netherlands
Volleyball players at the 2004 Summer Olympics
Dutch expatriate sportspeople in Italy
Expatriate volleyball players in Italy
Dutch expatriate sportspeople in Poland
Expatriate volleyball players in Poland
Dutch expatriate sportspeople in Germany
Expatriate volleyball players in Germany
Dutch expatriate sportspeople in Belgium
Expatriate volleyball players in Belgium
Jastrzębski Węgiel players
Middle blockers